The 1953 All-Big Seven Conference football team consists of American football players chosen by various organizations for All-Big Seven Conference teams for the 1953 college football season.  The selectors for the 1953 season included the Associated Press (AP) and the United Press (UP).  Players selected as first-team honorees by both the AP and UP are displayed in bold.

All-Big Seven selections

Backs
 John Bordogna, Nebraska (AP-1; UP-1)
 Veryl Switzer, Kansas State (AP-1; UP-1)
 Larry Grigg, Oklahoma (AP-1; UP-1)
 Bob Bauman, Missouri (AP-1)
 Max Burkett, Iowa State (UP-1 [FB])

Ends
 Gary Knafelc, Colorado (AP-1; UP-1)
 Ed Pence, Kansas State (AP-1)
 Max Boydston, Oklahoma (UP-1)

Tackles
 Roger Nelson, Oklahoma (AP-1; UP-1)
 Ted Connor, Nebraska (AP-1)
 Jerry Minnick, Nebraska (UP-1)

Guards
 J. D. Roberts, Oklahoma (AP-1; UP-1)
 Terry Roberts, Missouri (AP-1)
 Tommy O'Boyle, Kansas State (UP-1)

Centers
 Kurt Burris, Oklahoma (AP-1; UP-1)

Key
AP = Associated Press

UP = United Press

See also
1953 College Football All-America Team

References

All-Big Seven Conference football team
All-Big Eight Conference football teams